The hogtie is a method of tying the limbs together, rendering the subject immobile and helpless. Originally, it was applied to pigs (hence the name) and other young four-legged animals.

Details 

The hogtie when used on pigs and cattle has it where three of the four limbs are tied together, as tying all four together is difficult and can result in harm to the animal. When performed on a human, however, a hogtie is any position that results in the arms and legs being bound, both tied behind the person and then connecting the hands and feet.

See also 

 Hogtie bondage, an erotic BDSM practice.

References 

Physical restraint